David Hakstol (born July 30, 1968) is a Canadian ice hockey coach, currently serving as the head coach of the Seattle Kraken of the National Hockey League (NHL). A native of Warburg, Alberta, Hakstol was the head coach for Sioux City Musketeers for four seasons. He was also the head coach of the University of North Dakota men's ice hockey team for 11 seasons. Hakstol played for the Fighting Sioux from 1989 to 1992 and in the International Hockey League for five years before becoming a coach. Hakstol served as head coach of the Philadelphia Flyers from May 2015 until December 2018. He was an assistant coach for Canada's national men's team in 2017 and 2019.

Career
Hakstol attended the University of North Dakota and played hockey there from 1989 to 1992. He played minor league hockey for five years, including stints with the Indianapolis Ice and Minnesota Moose. After retiring as a player, he moved to the coaching ranks with the Sioux City Musketeers. He replaced a fired head coach in the middle of the 1996–97 season and remained in the role for four years. He was succeeded by Dave Siciliano.

Hakstol became an assistant coach with his alma mater North Dakota in 2000. In 2004, he was named head coach. In his tenure as North Dakota's head coach, he led the team to the NCAA Frozen Four seven times. Hakstol was honored with conference coach of the year awards in 2009 and 2015, and was an eight-time finalist for national coach of the year.

On May 18, 2015, it was announced that Hakstol would become the Philadelphia Flyers' 19th head coach. Hakstol is the first head coach to go directly from the NCAA to the NHL since 1982 (Bob Johnson from the University of Wisconsin to the Calgary Flames). Hakstol picked up his first NHL victory in the Flyers' third game of the season, a 1–0 win over the Florida Panthers.

On April 11, 2017, it was announced that Hakstol would join Jon Cooper, Gerard Gallant, and Dave King as coaches of Canada's men's national ice hockey team for the 2017 IIHF World Championship tournament.

On December 17, 2018, the Flyers relieved Hakstol as the head coach of the team after a 12–15–4 start to the 2018–19 season.

On June 29, 2019, Hakstol was hired as assistant head coach of the Toronto Maple Leafs.

On June 24, 2021, Hakstol was hired as the first head coach in the history of the Seattle Kraken.

Head coaching record

NHL

NCAA

USHL

References

External links
 
 Dave Hakstol profile at siouxsports.com
https://www.hockeycanada.ca/en-ca/news/2019-mwc-coaches-named-for-iihf-worlds

1968 births
Living people
Ice hockey people from Alberta
Indianapolis Ice players
Minnesota Moose players
North Dakota Fighting Hawks men's ice hockey coaches
North Dakota Fighting Hawks men's ice hockey players
Philadelphia Flyers coaches
Seattle Kraken coaches
Toronto Maple Leafs coaches
United States Hockey League coaches